Antarctic Press is a San Antonio-based comic book publishing company which publishes "Amerimanga" style comic books. The company also produces "how-to" and "you can" comics, instructing on areas of comic book creation and craft.

Beginning in 1985, Antarctic Press has published over 850 titles with a total circulation of over 5 million. Befitting the company name, Antarctic's self-proclaimed mission is to "publish the coolest creator-owned comics on Earth". Co-founder Ben Dunn's brother Joe Dunn is the company's publisher.

Many now-established creators started their careers at Antarctic (with most continuing to publish with them), including Chris Bunting, Ben Dunn, Eisner-nominated Rod Espinosa, and Joseph Wight. Cartoonist Alex Robinson serialized his first book, Box Office Poison, with Antarctic in the 1990s.

History
Antarctic Press was founded by Ben Dunn and Marc Ripley in late 1984 to publish the anthology Mangazine, one of North America's first publications of original English-language manga. Local San Antonio creators Fred Perry, Joseph Wight, and Rod Espinosa were early contributors to Mangazine; later all of them had their own Antarctic Press titles. Mangazine eventually ran for 120 issues in three volumes over a 20-year period.

Another early title was Extremely Silly Comics.

The company's first hit was Dunn's Amerimanga Ninja High School, which debuted as a limited series with Antarctic in 1987. Originally intended as a miniseries, the comic hit such a boom of popularity that it became a full series, currently totaling over 160 issues (as well as two miniseries, Ninja High School V2 and Quagmire USA, and the color limited series The Prom Formula). 

Co-founder Ripley left the company in 1989 and Dunn brought on his brother Joeming ("Joe") Dunn to help manage the business.

Fred Perry's Gold Digger, which debuted in limited series form in 1992, is still being published by Antarctic Press.

In the 1990s, the company also published furry comics and erotic comics — from 1994 to 1998 the company operated an erotic imprint, Venus Comics.

In late 1996, however, looking to cut costs and focus more on more mainstream properties, Antarctic discontinued publishing all translated manga, anthropomorphic, and adults-only titles. As a result, two Antarctic Press employees, Elin Winkler-Suarez and Pat Duke, left the company to form Radio Comix. Furrlough and Genus, both long-running anthology titles, were taken over by Radio Comix.

Many of Antarctic's staple characters, from titles including Warrior Nun Areala, Ninja High School, Gold Digger, The Courageous Princess, and Dragons Arms, came together in the 2005 How to Break into Comics, which also featured their creators in the narrative.

In April 2006, the popular title Warrior Nun Areala was re-launched as Warrior Nun Lazarus and began to include computer coloring.

In 2007, David Hutchison's Final Girl limited series gave readers the choice as to which characters lived and which ones died.

In August 2016, the company began publication of Rochelle, from creator and writer John E. Crowther and artist Dell Barras.

In 2018 Antarctic more than doubled its monthly publishing schedule to 15 titles. It also branched into distribution, taking on the comics of the all-ages San Antonio small-press publisher Guardian Knight Comics. 

In the spring of 2018 Antarctic announced to publish controversial creator Richard C. Meyer's Jawbreakers: Lost Souls (crowdfunded on Indiegogo) in. After a backlash and threat of a retailer boycott, however, on May 11, Antarctic decided not to publish the title. Meyer filed a civil suit against fellow creator Mark Waid for "tortious interference with contract, defamation, and exemplary damages" for working to keep his book from being published by Antarctic; on December 23, 2020, the parties released a joint statement announcing that "Mr. Meyer has decided to voluntarily dismiss the lawsuit".

Titles (selected)

Albedo Anthropomorphics — taken over from Thoughts & Images; later taken over by Shanda Fantasy Arts
American Woman
Bad Kids Go to Hell
Battle Girlz
Box Office Poison (21 issues plus a special, October 1996 – October 2000)
Chesty Sanchez
The Courageous Princess
Diesel
Dinowars
Dragon Arms
 Extremely Silly Comics
 Families of Altered Wars (includes Luftwaffe 1946)
 Fantastic Panic
Far West
Final Girl
Furrlough — taken over by Radio Comix
Gold Digger — written and drawn by Fred Perry
Hepcats (reprints plus one issue of original material)
A History of Webcomics
AP's How to Draw Manga
King of Zombies, written and drawn by Joseph Wight
 Land of Oz: the Manga
The Last Zombie
Luftwaffe 1946
Mangazine vol. 1 (5 issues, Aug. 1985–Dec. 1986)
 Mangazine vol. 2 (44 issues, Jan. 1989–May 1996)
 Mangazine vol. 3 (71 issues, July 1999–Nov. 2005)
MetaDocs written by Joeming Dunn, MD, and illustrated by Rod Espinosa
Mighty Tiny
Nazi Zombies
Neotopia
Ninja High School
 Oz: the Manga
Pirates versus Ninjas
President Evil, a zombie parody comic featuring Barack Obama
The Prince of Heroes
PolyCombats (2020)
Pose File
Punchline
Robotech
Rochelle
Sarah Palin vs. the World, a parody of Scott Pilgrim
The Science Fair
Sentai
Shanda The Panda
Shōjo
Steampunk Palin, a sci-fi satire featuring Sarah Palin
Stellar Losers
Strangers in Paradise by Terry Moore — 3 issues (1993–1994); debuted with Antarctic before becoming self-published
Strong Box the Big, Bad Book of Boon by H. Thomas Altman
Tank Vixens
Twilight X by Joseph Wight
Twilight X Storm
Wall Might, a Donald Trump-themed parody of My Hero Academia
Warrior Nun Areala
Weapons File
Wild Life, a humorous slice-of-life anthology edited by Elin Winkler-Suarez which ran February 1993-April 1995 for twelve issues. It included Joe Rosales' Wildlifers and John Nunnemacher's Buffalo Wings.
Winds of Winter
Zetraman: Revival

Venus Comics titles (selected) 

 The Barr Girls (1996) — by Donna Barr
 Battle Binder Plus (1995)
 Big Boob Bondage (1997)
 Bondage Fairies (1994)
 Cheeta Pop Scream Queen (1994)
 Deviant (1999) — by Robin Bougie
 Emblem (1994) — by Kei Taniguchi
 Genus (1994–1997) — long-running anthology; taken over by Radio Comix
 Melty Feeling (1996) — by Komashi Mamiya
 No-No UFO (1996)
 Nosferatu: The Death Mass (1997–1998) — by Holden Morris
 Vanity Angel (1994)

Creators associated with Antarctic Press 

 H. Thomas Altman
 Dell Barras
 Robby Bevard
 John E. Crowther
 Brian Denham
 Lee Duhig
 Ben Dunn
 Rod Espinosa
 Danny Fahs
 Ganbear
 Wes Hartman
 Ben Hunzeker
 David Hutchison
 Michel Lacombe
 Richard Moore
 Terry Moore
 Ted Nomura
 Fred Perry
 Gianluca Piredda
 Alex Robinson
 Jochen Weltjens
 Joseph Wight
 Elin Winkler-Suarez

Notes

References

Antarctic Press at the Big Comic Book DataBase

External links

A Tank Vixens history

Companies based in San Antonio
Comic book publishing companies of the United States
Publishing companies established in 1984
Original English-language manga